Mi Jung "M.J." Hur (born 5 December 1989) is a South Korean female professional golfer.

Hur played most of her amateur career in South Korea. In 2006, she received a sponsors exemption to play in the Hana Bank-KOLON Championship and made the most of it by finishing T6.

It was late in 2007 that Hur turned professional. She played the Futures Tour and notched one victory at the Louisiana Pelican Classic. Hur's 4th-place finish on the 2008 Futures Tour money list earned her a LPGA Tour card.

Hur's first win on the LPGA Tour was at the 2009 Safeway Classic. She defeated Suzann Pettersen and Michele Redman in a playoff.

Professional wins (5)

LPGA Tour (4)

1 Co-sanctioned by the Ladies European Tour.

LPGA Tour playoff record (1–0)

Futures Tour (1)

Results in LPGA majors
Results not in chronological order before 2019.

^ The Evian Championship was added as a major in 2013.

CUT = missed the halfway cut
WD = withdrew
NT = not tournament
T = tied

Summary

Most consecutive cuts made – 8 (2016 British – 2018 ANA)
Longest streak of top-10s – 1 (twice)

References

External links

Biography on seoulsisters.com

South Korean female golfers
LPGA Tour golfers
Golfers from Miami
Golfers from Texas
People from McKinney, Texas
1989 births
Living people